FC Gorodeya (FK Haradzeya) was a Belarusian football club based in Gorodeya, Nesvizh Raion, Minsk Oblast.

History 
The team was founded in 2004 as a futsal club. They played in the Minsk Oblast championship and later in the Belarusian futsal championship and Cup.

In 2007, they debuted in the Minsk Oblast football championship as well as the Belarusian Cup. In 2008, they joined the Belarusian Second League, and after winning the 2010 season, the team made its debut in the First League in 2011.

In 2016, Gorodeya made its debut in the Belarusian Premier League. In spring 2021 the club was disbanded.

References

External links 
Official Website 
Unofficial Website 

 
Gorodeya
Sport in Minsk Region
2004 establishments in Belarus
Association football clubs established in 2004
2021 disestablishments in Belarus
Association football clubs disestablished in 2021